Kamho station is a railway station in Kosŏng county, Kangwŏn province, North Korea on the Kŭmgangsan Ch'ŏngnyŏn Line of the Korean State Railway. Although the line continues across the DMZ to South Korea, that section is not presently in use and so Kamho station is the operational terminus of the line.

History

The station was opened on 1 November 1935 by the Chosen Government Railway, along with the rest of the sixth section of the original Tonghae Pukpu Line from Oegŭmgang (nowadays called Kŭmgangsan Ch'ŏngnyŏn) to Kansŏng.

References

Railway stations in North Korea